Jone da Silva Pinto (born 13 November 1991), commonly known as Jone or Pinto is a Brazilian footballer who plays as a centre forward.

Career
He began his career from the youth team of Brasil de Pelotas, and in 2012 was given on loan to Atlético Farroupilha. He has also played in Sun Pegasus, in the Hong Kong Premier League and for Ethnikos Achna, in the Cypriot First Division. On 15 January 2015, he was given on loan to AE Larissa till the end of the season 2014-15.

Pinto moved to Super League 2 side PAS Lamia and secured 34 appearances and scored 10 goals for the side in 2015-2016 season. He followed a transfer Aris in 2017 but did't appeared for the Super League club. Initially in 2019 He was at Irodotos secured a goal for the Gamma Ethniki side.

He played for Greek side Aspropyrgos in the Football League until mid 2020.

References

External links
soccerpunter Profile

1991 births
Living people
Brazilian footballers
Brazilian expatriate footballers
Cypriot First Division players
TSW Pegasus FC players
Athlitiki Enosi Larissa F.C. players
Ethnikos Achna FC players
Irodotos FC players
Al-Sahel SC (Saudi Arabia) players
Saudi Second Division players
Expatriate footballers in Greece
Expatriate footballers in Cyprus
Expatriate footballers in Saudi Arabia
Expatriate footballers in Hong Kong
Association football forwards